Brice Christian Butler (born January 29, 1990) is a former American football wide receiver. He was drafted by the Oakland Raiders in the seventh round of the 2013 NFL Draft. He played college football at USC and San Diego State.

Early years
Butler attended Norcross (GA) in Norcross, Georgia, where he played football as a wide receiver. As a junior in 2006, he had 35 receptions for 680 yards (19.4 avg.) with 9 touchdowns. His 2007 honors included Super Prep All-American, Prep Star All-American, ESPN 150, Super Prep Elite 50, Prep Star Dream Team, Super Prep All-Dixie, Prep Star All-Southeast and Atlanta Journal-Constitution Super Southern 100 as a senior after totalling 1,186 receiving yards with 15 touchdowns.

He also competed in track & field at Norcross. As a sophomore, he participated at the state meet in the 4 × 100 m relay, finishing seventh with a time of 42.54 seconds. At the Region 7-5A Meet, he helped lead his 4 × 400 m relay team to victory with a time of 3:22.82 minutes. He also posted personal-best times of 22.7 seconds in the 200-meter dash and 50.33 seconds in the 400-meter dash as a junior.

College career
Butler accepted a football scholarship from the University of Southern California. His best season came as a redshirt freshman, when he recorded 20 receptions for 292 yards and 2 touchdowns, while earning Pac-10 All-Freshman honors. The next year, head coach Pete Carroll left for the NFL and Lane Kiffin was hired to replace him. During his three years with the team, Butler was a backup wide receiver that posted 4 starts, 41 receptions for 554 yards and 3 touchdowns.

After graduating in 2011 with a major in public policy, management and planning, he transferred to San Diego State University to play his final season and enroll in a master's program. He registered 24 receptions for 347 yards and 4 touchdowns.

College stats

Professional career

Oakland Raiders
Butler was selected by the Oakland Raiders in the seventh round (209th overall) of the 2013 NFL Draft, after running 4.37 seconds in the 40-yard dash in his pro day workout. As a rookie, he appeared in 10 games with 2 starts, tallying 9 receptions for 103 yards in 10 games. He did not have a catch after week 6 and was declared inactive for 5 games. 

In 2014, he appeared in 15 games, registering 21 receptions for 280 yards and 2 touchdowns. He recovered a blocked punt for a touchdown against the Seattle Seahawks.

On September 15, 2015, he was traded to the Dallas Cowboys along with a sixth round pick (#189- used for Anthony Brown), in exchange for a fifth round pick (#143- used for DeAndré Washington).

Dallas Cowboys
In 2015 the Dallas Cowboys acquired Butler for depth purposes after Dez Bryant was injured in the season opener. He passed Devin Street on the depth chart as the team's fourth wide receiver. Against the New Orleans Saints he had a 67-yard reception but suffered a hamstring injury in the play, which would limit him for six weeks. He played the majority of the final two games, totaling 8 receptions for 134 yards. His most productive game came in the Week 16 against the Buffalo Bills, making 4 receptions for 74 yards. He registered a total of 12 receptions for 258 yards (21.5-yard average) in 7 games.

In 2016, he worked with the first unit during OTAs while Bryant recovered from a broken foot. He started against the San Francisco 49ers in place of an injured Bryant and scored his first touchdown with the Cowboys. He also started against the Cincinnati Bengals and the Green Bay Packers. He was the team's fourth wide receiver, but suffered through inconsistent play and in some games with untimely penalties. He finished with 16	receptions for 219 yards (13.7-yard average) and 3 touchdowns. In the NFC Divisional 31–34 playoffs loss against the Green Bay Packers, he had a rarely called illegal substitution penalty  negating a 22-yard play and costing the team an additional 15 yards, and also had a key drop in the end zone.

On March 8, 2017, the Cowboys re-signed Butler to a one-year contract. He had a strong preseason and there was an expectation of him being more of a factor in the offense. In the first 5 games, he collected 207 receiving yards and 2 touchdowns, before suffering a foot injury in practice that forced him to miss 3 games. In the season finale against the Philadelphia Eagles, he a had a 30-yard touchdown reception for the only points in a 6-0 win. He remained as the fourth wide receiver, appearing in 13 games, while making 15 receptions for 317 yards (21.1-yard average) and 3 touchdowns.

Arizona Cardinals
On April 2, 2018, Butler signed a two-year contract with the Arizona Cardinals. He was released by the Cardinals on September 1, 2018.

Dallas Cowboys (second stint)
On September 18, 2018, Butler re-signed with the Dallas Cowboys, who were struggling using a wide receiver-by-committee approach, after the release of Dez Bryant. He was released on October 22, to make room for newly acquired wide receiver Amari Cooper.

Miami Dolphins
On November 14, 2018, Butler signed with the Miami Dolphins. He was released during final roster cuts on August 31, 2019.

NFL career statistics

Personal life
Butler's father, Bobby, played 12 years for the Atlanta Falcons as a defensive back. His brother Brenton played professional basketball with the RSV Eintracht Stahnsdorf of the ProB league in Germany.
Brice also runs a self named YouTube Channel (Brice Butler) that revolves around Golf.

References

External links
Dallas Cowboys bio
San Diego State Aztecs bio
USC Trojans bio

1990 births
Living people
People from Norcross, Georgia
Sportspeople from the Atlanta metropolitan area
Players of American football from Georgia (U.S. state)
American football wide receivers
Norcross High School alumni
USC Trojans football players
San Diego State Aztecs football players
Oakland Raiders players
Dallas Cowboys players
Arizona Cardinals players
Miami Dolphins players